Nagorny is a rural locality (a settlement) in Biysk, Altai Krai, Russia. The population was 7,777 as of 2013.

References 

Rural localities in Biysk Urban Okrug